The 12759 / 12760 Charminar Express is a very popular train operating between the metropolitan cities, Chennai and Hyderabad. Now it runs between Tambaram and  via Chennai Egmore.

Train schedule
Charminar is one of the most prestigious trains of SCR, with 24 coaches (first 24-coacher of SCR). After it got its LHB rakes it was reduced to 22 coaches.
Train number 12759 runs from Chennai Tambaram to Hyderabad. It departs from Tambaram (TBM) at 17.10 Hrs and arrives at Hyderabad Deccan Nampally Station (HYB) at 07.50 Hrs the next day, with 16 intermediate halts.
Train number 12760 runs from Hyderabad to Chennai Tambaram. It departs from Hyderabad Deccan Nampally Station (HYB) at 18.00 Hrs and arrives at Tambaram (TBM) at 07.55 Hrs next day.

Coach composition
The train consists of 22 coaches.

 1 AC First cum AC Two Tier, 
 3 AC Two Tier, 
 6 AC Three Tier, 
 8 Sleeper class, 
 2 General Unreserved, 
 2 End-on Generator cars (EOG). 

Moreover, Charminar Express is one of the few trains of the country having CBC (Centre Buffer Coupling) rakes with GPS system. Also the first train to become a CBC. And first 24 coacher of SCR. From 5 November 2019, Charminar Express is being operated with LHB coach and coaches were reduced to 22.

Relevance
This train is named after Charminar, an historical monument in Hyderabad built to mark the victory against the plague epidemic that haunted Hyderabad in the 15th century. "Charminar" refers to the four minarets of the monument on the top.

Traction
It is hauled by a Lallaguda-based WAP-7 locomotive.

Route and halts

See also
 Charminar
 Rail transport in India
 South Central Railway zone
 Rajkot–Secunderabad Express

References

External links

 Charminar Express route map India Rail Info

Transport in Hyderabad, India
Transport in Chennai
Named passenger trains of India
Express trains in India
Rail transport in Telangana
Rail transport in Andhra Pradesh
Rail transport in Tamil Nadu